James Ebenezzar "Possum Jim" Pixlee (March 29, 1889 – February 17, 1967) was an American football and basketball coach and college athletics administrator. He served as the head football coach at Missouri Wesleyan College from 1914 to 1916, Oklahoma Agricultural and Mechanical College—now known as Oklahoma State University–Stillwater— frin 1919 to 1920, Westminster College in Fulton, Missouri from 1922 to 1928, and George Washington University from 1929 to 1937. Pixlee was also the head basketball coach at Oklahoma A&M (1919–1921), Westminster (1922–1929), and George Washington (1930–1932).

Pixlee attended the University of Missouri, where he lettered in football during the 1909, 1911, and 1912 seasons. He was head coach of the Oklahoma A&M Aggies for the 1919 and 1920 football seasons. During this period, the team won three of their 16 games. By 1929 Pixlee was director of athletics at Missouri's Westminster College.

In 1929, Pixlee took over the head coaching position of the George Washington Colonials, starting with an 0–8 season. He went on to win more football games than any other coach in George Washington's history, leading the Colonials to records crowds and coaching Alphonse "Tuffy" Leemans, whom David Holt described as "perhaps GW's greatest athlete ever". Pixlee left that position in 1937.

Pixlee was married to Blossom Pixlee. He died on February 17, 1967, at his home in Cameron, Missouri.

Head coaching record

Football

References

External links
 

1889 births
1967 deaths
American football ends
George Washington Colonials athletic directors
George Washington Colonials football coaches
George Washington Colonials men's basketball coaches
Missouri Tigers football players
Missouri Wesleyan Owls athletic directors
Missouri Wesleyan Owls football coaches
Oklahoma State Cowboys football coaches
Oklahoma State Cowboys basketball coaches
Westminster Blue Jays football coaches
Westminster Blue Jays men's basketball coaches
Coaches of American football from Missouri
Players of American football from Missouri
Basketball coaches from Missouri